Borassus akeassii is a species of palmyra palm which is native to west and central Africa. It occurs from Senegal to Congo-Kinshasa. It was first described in 2006, having previously been confused with Borassus aethiopum and Borassus flabellifer. It is used by local people for a variety of purposes, particularly sap extraction.

References

External links

akeassii
Flora of West Tropical Africa
Plants described in 2006